Chris John may refer to:
 Chris John (politician)
 Chris John (boxer)
 Chris John (rugby union)